World Orders Old and New is a book by Noam Chomsky, first published in 1994 and updated in 1996 by Columbia University Press. In the book, Chomsky writes about the international scene since 1945, devoting particular attention to events following the collapse of the Soviet Union. He  critiques  Western government, from imperialist foreign policies to the Clinton administration's promises to the poor. His judgment of the "new world order" foresees a growing abyss between the rich and poor, in the United States and internationally.

See also
 American foreign policy   
 The Cold War
 Economic systems
 Globalisation              
 General Agreement on Tariffs and Trade (GATT)
 Middle East conflicts

1994 non-fiction books
Books by Noam Chomsky
English-language books
Columbia University Press books